Bojnice is a historical town in central Slovakia located on the Nitra river, near the city of Prievidza. The town is situated just below the Bojnice Castle. It has a population of around 5,000.

Bojnice is best known for its popular tourist attractions, among them being the largest zoo in Slovakia and the Bojnice castle, and generally for being one of the oldest spa towns in Slovakia.

Geography
Bojnice lies in the upper Nitra river valley, under the Strážov Mountains. It is located very near the city of Prievidza with which it shares a common public transport system. Other major cities nearby include Žilina 60 kilometres to the north and Trenčín 65 kilometres to the west.

History
The town's history is closely connected to that of Bojnice Castle. The town was first mentioned in writing in 1113, when it was mentioned as a settlement under the castle. Bojnice was granted town privileges in 1366.

Landmarks

The town is most known for the Bojnice Castle, first mentioned in 1113 and originally built as a wooden fort, it was over time built as a stone castle and in the 20th century in the Romantic style. Today, it is a popular tourist attraction. The castle has appeared in many international films and a well-known international festival of spectres takes place there every year. It is built on travertine rock with a natural cave.

The Bojnice zoo was founded in 1955. In 2006 it had 355 different species and more than 1,800 animals.

Bojnice is also known for its spa. The therapeutic springs were mentioned in 1549 for the first time. Today they treat patients with disorders of the locomotor system, with rheumatic diseases, post traumatic conditions, conditions after orthopaedic disturbances of the spine of adolescents, neurological diseases and occupational diseases.

Demographics
According to the 2001 census, the town had 5,006 inhabitants. 97.06% of inhabitants were Slovaks, 0.68% Czechs and 0.24% Germans. The religious make-up was 74.55% Roman Catholics, 19% people with no religious affiliation and 2% Lutherans.

Notable people
Karina Habšudová, tennis player
Miloslav Mečíř, tennis player, Olympic winner
Andrej Sekera, Dallas Stars (National Hockey League) defenseman
Mirka Vavrinec, tennis player
Zuzana Paulechová, classical pianist
Antonia Liskova, Italian actress
Erika Pochybova Johnson, artist
Juraj Kucka, footballer
Anna Záborská, Member of the European Parliament
Ján Vlasko, slovak footballer

Twin towns — sister cities
Bojnice is twinned with:
 Jeseník, Czech Republic
 Bad Krozingen, Germany
 Rosta, Italy
 Zator, Poland

See also
List of municipalities and towns in Slovakia

References

Genealogical resources
The records for genealogical research are available at the state archive "Statny Archiv in Nitra, Slovakia"

 Roman Catholic church records (births/marriages/deaths): 1668-1912 (parish A)

External links 
Official municipal website
Information Center of Bojnice
Bojnice Castle
Bojnice Spa 
Bojnice photos
Surnames of living people in Bojnice

Cities and towns in Slovakia
Villages and municipalities in Prievidza District
Spa towns in Slovakia